The Hoblitzelle Foundation is a foundation which makes grants to social service, educational, medical, and other organizations in Texas, particularly in the Dallas area.

Based in Dallas, the foundation was established by Karl and Esther Hoblitzelle in 1942.

References

External links
Hoblitzelle Foundation website

Hoblitzelle Foundation
Non-profit organizations based in Texas
1942 establishments in Texas
Organizations established in 1942